The Ministry of Development of North Eastern Region is a Government of India ministry, established in September 2001, which functions as the nodal Department of the Central Government to deal with matters related to the socio-economic development of the eight States of Northeast India: Arunachal Pradesh, Assam, Manipur, Meghalaya, Mizoram, Nagaland, Tripura and Sikkim. It acts as a facilitator between the Central Ministries/ Departments and the State Governments of the North Eastern Region in the economic development including removal of infrastructural bottlenecks, provision of basic minimum services, creating an environment for private investment and to remove impediments to lasting peace and security in the North Eastern Region.

The current, Minister of Development of North Eastern Region is G. Kishan Reddy.

Functions and responsibilities 

The Department of Development of North Eastern Region (DoNER) was created in 2001 and was accorded the status of a full-fledged ministry in May 2004. The ministry is mainly concerned with the creation of infrastructure for economic development of North-Eastern region.

Main activities/functions of the DoNER.
 Non Lapsible Central Pool of Resources (NLCPR)  Coordination with the Central Ministries and the State Governments of the NE states.
 Capacity Building
 Advocacy and Publicity
 International Cooperation
 Enterprises of the Department

Organisations
The ministry has following organisations functioning under it:
 North Eastern Development Finance Corporation Ltd.(NEDFi)
 North Eastern Regional Agricultural Marketing Corporation Limited (NERAMAC)
 The Sikkim Mining Corporation Limited. (SMC)
 North Eastern Handlooms and Handicrafts Development Corporation (NEHHDC)

List Of Ministers

List of Ministers of State

Northeast India connectivity projects 

Commerce with South and East Asian nations accounts for almost 45% of India's foreign trade. Myanmar and ASEAN nations are part of India's Look East policy. India is part of ASEAN+6, Asia Cooperation Dialogue, Asia-Pacific Economic Cooperation, Asian Clearing Union, Asian Development Bank, Bangladesh Bhutan India Nepal Initiative, BIMSTEC, East Asia Summit, Mekong-Ganga Cooperation, SAARC, South Asia Subregional Economic Cooperation, United Nations Economic and Social Commission for Asia and the Pacific, Asian Highway Network and the Trans-Asian Railway network.

Major initiatives covered are Transport between India and Bangladesh, Bangladesh–India border, India-Myanmar barrier, Bhutan–India border, McMahon Line, etc.

Bridges 
 
 List of road bridges on Brahmaputra River

Roads

International roads 
NE has 5,000 km border with Nepal, Bhutan, China, Bangladesh and Myanmar while being isolated and connected to rest of India by 20 km narrow chicken-neck Siliguri Corridor.
 Asian Highway Network
 ASEAN and Look East connectivity

Strategic National Highways (NH) 
13,500 km were NH out of total 3,76,819 km of road length in NE (March 2012).
 Schemes: Bharatmala and NH
 Non Lapsable Central Pool of Resources (NLCPR) plan for NE and Look East connectivity.
 Special Accelerated Road Development Programme in North East (SARDP-NE) plan for the China border roads.
 Funding: 
 Total approved (A+B):  (until Dec 2017). 
 A.  3,840 km approved and  1,266 km completed (2014 to Dec 2017). 
  additional funding released to ensure completion by March 2023 of current NE NH projects by plugging the gap, on 100% centre-funding basis, instead of usual 90:10 centre-state funding mechanism (Dec 2017). 
 B.  additional approved under Bharatmala for NE NH (Dec 2017).
 Routes: Major NE NH route map and SARDP Arunachal roads map.
 Highways: 
 Arunachal Frontier Highway 2,000 km route along the China border in upper Himalayas, 
 Northeast border roads: 
 BRO border roads:  — 73 border roads: incl. Sikkim and Arunachal, all to be completed by March 2022 (June 2017).  — 410 border bridges:  - 144 in Arunachal (75 under construction completing by 2020),  - 40 in Sikkim under construction (Dec 2017).  — 17 border rail and road tunnels: total length of 100 km,  - Arunachal (Nechipu Pass (near Bomdila) and Sela Pass tunnels on Bogibeel Assam to Sagalee to Tawang NH13),  - North Sikkim (578 meter Theng Pass tunnel on NH310A between Chungthang and Tung) (Dec 2017).
 Arunachal East-West Corridor along the Assam border in the lower foothills (marked in red) is being taken under Bharatmala project.
 2,570 km approved NH (1917+653 in-progress and completed) in Arunachal, 36% road connectivity, 22 km per 100 km2 Arunachal road density including dirt tracks (c. Nov 2017).

Other roads 
 North Eastern Council inter-state projects and roads: 
 47 new inter-state roads of 1,666 km costing , of which 4 were taken within plan ending March 2017.
 2014 to Dec 2017:  
  projects executed, 
  to  rise in the annual budget.
 56 to 138 increase in the number of projects, incl. Bramputra Study Centre established to research river ecosystem.
 PMGSY roads in NE, including border village roads]. Relaxation to be given to the minimum 250 people habitation in case of villages within 50 km of border.

Railway 
 Northeast railway connectivity projects
 Trans-Asian Railway 
 Sivok–Rangpo line, 44 km long, to Gangtok in Sikkim.
 Teteliya–Byrnihat line, 22 km long, from Guwahati's suburb Tetelia to Byrnihat near Shillon in Meghalaya is likely to be completed by March 2022.
 Dimapur–Kohima line, 82 km long, to Kohima In Nagaland is expected to be completed by March 2023.
 Jiribam–Imphal line, 111 km long, to Imphal is likely to be completed by March 2022.
 Bhairabi–Sairang line, 51 km long, to Aizawl in Mizoram is likely to be completed by March 2023.

Air

Airports development 
NER Airports. The Indian government upgraded 12 non-operational airports into operational airports in NE (May 2017, work started on 8 airports in 2014). LGBIA Guwahati will operate as the inter-regional hub and Agartala Airport, Dibrugarh Airport and Imphal Airport will operate as intra-regional hubs by extending runways and apron, and by building terminal building and maintenance hangars at these airports. Three new greenfield under-construction airports are Itanagar Holangi Airport, Pakyong Airport-Operationalized (Sikkim) and Chiethu Airport (Nagaland).

Airports development phase-I (fy2016-17 to fy2019-20) 
Airports Authority of India (AAI) will spend  between 2018 and 2020, including the following will be completed by 2019-20 (c. Dec 2017):
 Assam
 Lokpriya Gopinath Bordoloi International Airport, Guwahati modernisation, the Chief Minister is also pushing to the convert it into a hub for UDAN and connectivity to at least 9 ASEAN nations (c. Dec 2017).
 Arunachal Pradesh
 Itanagar Holangi Airport new airport under construction
 Tezu Airport upgrade
 Tripura
 Agartala International Airport, currently  new terminal building upgrade to international airport,
 Kailashahar Airport upgrade for UDAN flights, 138 km from Agartala.
 Meghalaya
 Shillong Airport upgrade,

Airports development phase-II (fy2018-19 to -) 
The central government will invest a further  to develop more NR airports. Several advanced landing ground heliports will be upgraded to dual army-civilian airports. This likely includes the following:
 Arunachal Pradesh
 Along Airport
 Anini Airport
 Daporijo Airport
 Koloriang Airport
 Pasighat Airport
 Tawang Airport
 Tura Airport
 Zero Airport
 Assam
 Rupsi Airport
 Sikkim
 Pakyong Airport-operationalized
 Nagaland
 Chiethu Airport under-construction

Flights 
Among airports in Northeast India, the following were connected under UDAN:

UDAN flights 
UDAN Phase-I flights started at Shillong Airport, Dimapur Airport, Imphal International Airport, Silchar Airport, Lengpui Aizawl Airport and Agartala Airport.

UDAN Phase-II flights started at TBA?

Other flights 
2014-2017 NEC plan proposes to work towards starting the following flights: 
 Kolkata Airport to
 Guwahati-Kumming
 Dimapur–Bangkok
 Lokpriya Gopinath Bordoloi International Airport, Guwahati to 
 Imphal-Yangon
 Yangon-Bangkok
 Mandalay-Kumming
 Shillong-Dhaka
 Agartala Airport to
 Dimapur-Yangon
 Dhaka
 Imphal Airport to Mandalay-Bangkok
 Silchar Airport to Imphal-Mandalay

Waterways

International NE waterways
 India-Myanmar
 Kaladan Multi-Modal Transit Transport Project
 India-Bangladesh 
 Waterways as per "Indo-Bangladesh Protocol on Inland Water Transit & Trade": 
 Kolkata-Pandu, Guwahati-Kolkata
 Kolkata-Karimganj-Kolkata
 Rajshahi-Dhulian-Rajshahi
 Pandu-Karimganj-Pandu
 Seaports for inter-country trade
 India: Haldia Port (West Bengal), Port of Kolkata (West Bengal), Pandu, Guwahati (Assam), Karimganj (Assam) and Silghat (Assam).
 Bangladesh: Port of Narayanganj, Khulna, Port of Mongla, Sirajganj and Ashuganj.

Inland National waterways in NE 
 NER Waterways: 20 National Waterways in NE 
National Waterway 2: Sadiya and Dhubri on Bangladesh-India border 891 km stretch of Brahmaputra River is already operational.
 19 additional NE National Waterways under development (as of Dec 2017). 
 NW6: Aai River, Assam, 71 km.
 NW16: Barak River, Assam, 121 km.
 NW18: Beki River, Assam, 73 km.
 NW30: Dihing River, Assam, 114 km.
 NW31: Dhansiri River-Chathe River, Assam, 110 km.
 NW32: Dikhu River, Assam, 63 km.
 NW33: Doyans River, Assam, 61 km.
 NW38: Gangadhar River, Assam & West Bengal, 62 km.
 NW39: Ganol River, Meghalaya, 49 km.
 NW50: Jinjiram River, Assam & Meghalaya, 43 km.
 NW57: Kopili River, Assam, 46 km.
 NW61: Kumari River, Meghalaya, 28 km.
 NW62: Lohit River, Assam, 100 km.
 NW82: Puthimari River, Assam, 72 km.
 NW93: Simsang River, Meghalaya, 62 km.
 NW95: Subansiri River, Assam, 111 km.
 NW101: Tizu River-Zungki River, Nagaland.
 NW102: Tlawng River, Mizoram, 86 km.
 NW106: Umngot River, Meghalaya, 20 km.
 More potential NER National Waterwaysare  being considered.

Power
As of December 2017,  power transmission grid project approved in 2014 is being implemented of which 2,540 km lines already laid, and 16 hydro power projects of 5676 MW being implemented and additional 694 MW projects already implemented.

Tourism

Look-East Connectivity

Commerce with South and East Asian nations accounts for almost 45% of India's foreign trade. Myanmar and ASEAN nations are part of India's Look East policy. India is part of ASEAN+6, Asia Cooperation Dialogue, Asian Clearing Union, Asian Development Bank, Bangladesh Bhutan India Nepal Initiative, BIMSTEC, East Asia Summit, Mekong-Ganga Cooperation, SAARC, South Asia Subregional Economic Cooperation, United Nations Economic and Social Commission for Asia and the Pacific, Asian Highway Network and the Trans-Asian Railway network.

Seaport development 
 Sittwe Port, Myanmar's multimodel port being developed by India
 Sabang Deepsea Port, jointly developed by India and Indonesia under strategic military and economic agreement, Indira Point, India's southernmost point, is close to Indonesia's Rondo Island and Aceh Province.

See also Extreme points of India

India-Myanmar-China Stilwell Road revival

Discussions are also proceeding on reopening the World War II-era Stilwell Road linking India's Assam state with China's Yunnan province through Myanmar.

India–Myanmar–Thailand Trilateral Highway
It is AH1 of Asian Highway Network. The road is expected to boost trade and commerce in the ASEAN–India Free Trade Area, as well as with the rest of Southeast Asia. India has also proposed extending the highway to Cambodia, Laos and Vietnam.

India and ASEAN have plans to extend this route to Laos, Cambodia and Vietnam as this connectivity will generate annually, an estimated US$70 billion in incremental GDP and 20 million in incremental aggregate employment by 2025, and India has offered US$1 billion line-of-credit for this project (c. Dec 2017).

Imphal-Moreh-Mandalay national highway upgrade
Imphal-Moreh-Mandalay Highway currently exists. In May 2017, the Indian Ministry of Road Transport and Highway stated that it would spend an estimated  to upgrade roads and highways in North East India in order to boost the region's connectivity with Myanmar and Bangladesh. Among these projects, the Ministry plans to widen the  Imphal-Moreh highway in Manipur which currently serves as an important trade route between India and Myanmar. This would provide the Manipur's capital city of Imphal with direct access to the trilateral highway.

Zokhawthar-Mandalay road strengthening
Mizoram-Kalemyo Highway is a road widening and strengthening project planned by India. In May 2017, the Indian Ministry of Road Transport also plans to construct a  highway linking Zokhawthar-Rikhawdar (also called "Rih") near Champhai, a border town in Mizoram, with the trilateral highway at Kalemyo. This will serve as a second route providing direct connectivity from Mizoram to the trilateral highway.

Mago-Thingbu to Vijaynagar Border Road 

The Mago-Thingbu–Vijaynagar Border Highway, also known as Arunachal Frontier Highway, in Arunachal Pradesh India is a  road proposed to be built along the McMahon Line (international border between India and China) by the Government of India at the cost of INR40,000 crore (approx. US$6.5 billion as per 2014 prices). Currently, along the alignment of this proposed road there is "little habitation" and there are only "small stretches of minor roads". An assessment by the Ministry of Defence (India) in 2013 found that of the 503 stretches on the borders planned to be completed by 2022, only 17 were complete and work was underway on just 50. In 2014 October, Kiren Rijiju, Union Minister of State for Home Affairs of India was trying to expedite the project along with another proposed highway East-West Industrial Corridor Highway, Arunachal Pradesh in Arunachal Pradesh as he said  "I am proposing to undertake this road along with another in the foothill areas of Arunachal Pradesh state from Bhairabkunda in Assam located at the tri-junction of Bhutan, Assam and Arunachal Pradesh to Ruksin in East Siang district of Arunachal Pradesh state which will serve as an industrial corridor for the people residing in the foothill areas of the state".

Manipur-Mandalay bus service from 2018
Manipur-Mandalay bus service is pending subject to the signing of motor vehicle agreement. In September 2017, Indian ambassador to Myanmar announced that an Imphal-Mandalay India-Myanmar bus service will commence from 2018 after India and Myanmar sign the motor vehicle agreement.

Imphal-Kalay-Mandalay flight

Imphal-Kalay-Mandalay flight is a proposed air service. In September 2017, Indian ambassador to Myanmar also proposed that a flight service from Imphal in Manipur to Mandalay via stopover in Kalay (Kalaymyo) in Sagaing Division of Myanmar could be started under UDAN regional connectivity scheme. It was proposed to DoNER in 2012 and a successful trial run was conducted in December 2015.

Tinsukia-Myitkyina railway

Tinsukia-Myitkyina railway is a proposed new railway link between the existing rail stations at Tinsukia-Doom Dooma in Assam state of India and Myitkyina in Kachin State of Myanmar, by laying new rail track via Shin Bway Yang and Sumprabum. Indian Railways uses broad gauge (1,676 mm or 5 ft 6 in) and Myanmar, Thailand, Vietnam and Malaysia use narrow gauge (1 meter). In December 2017, India offered a US$1 billion line of credit to build connections to ASEAN nations.

Imphal-Kalaymyo railway
Imphal-Kalaymyo railway is a proposed new railway link between the existing rail stations at Imphal in Manipur of India and Kalay in Myanmar. Indian Railways uses broad gauge (1,676 mm or 5 ft 6 in) and Myanmar, Thailand, Vietnam and Malaysia use narrow gauge (1 meter). In December 2017, India offered a US1 billion line of credit to build connections to ASEAN nations.

Aizawl-Wuntho railway
Aizawl-Wuntho railway is a proposed new railway link between the existing railway station at Wuntho in Myanmar and by extending the under construction Bairabi–Sairang line via Aizawl-Champhai in Mizoram of India to Wuntho in Myanmar which currently goes further north up to Myitkyina towards China–Myanmar border. These are to be taken up with assistance of India's 1 billion line of credit for connections to ASEAN nations.

Aizawl-Kalaymyo railway
Aizawl-Kalaymyo railway is a proposed new railway link between the existing railway station Kalay in Myanmar and by extending the under construction Bairabi–Sairang line via Aizawl-Champhai in Mizoram of India to Kalay in Myanmar. These are to be taken up with assistance of India's 1 billion line of credit for connections to ASEAN nations.

Aizawl-Kyauktaw-Sittwe railway
Aizawl-Kyauktaw-Sittwe railway is a proposed new railway link between the existing Kyauktaw-Sittwe railway in Myanmar and by extending the under construction Bairabi–Sairang line via Aizawl-Lunglei-Lawngtlai in Mizoram of India to Sittwe Port in Myanmar developed by India. Kyauktaw to Minbu is an under construction railway to link Sittwe with the exiting Myanmar railway network. These are to be taken up with assistance of India's 1 billion line of credit for connections to ASEAN nations.

India-Myanmar-Thailand railway

India-Myanmar-Thailand railway is a proposed new railway link, parts of which already exist, by constructing missing links between Aizawl and Imphal to Myanmar railway network and by linking existing railway lines in southern Myanmar to the Thailand rail network in 2 locations:
 Mongnai existing railway east in Myanmar to Chiang Mai in north-west Thailand
 Kyauk Shat or Dawei to Nam Tok near Bangkok

India-Myanmar-Thailand-Laos railway

India-Myanmar-Thailand-Laos railway is a proposed new railway link, parts of which already exist, by constructing missing links between Aizawl and Imphal to Myanmar railway network and Myanmar-to-Thailand to connect railway in Laos. Laos only has one railway station in the whole nation, located 20 km east of Vientiane, that was built by State Railway of Thailand during 2007-09 by extending its metre-gauge network across the Thai–Lao Friendship Bridge from Thanaleng Railway Station in Thailand. Test trains began running on July 4, 2008, and Princess Maha Chakri Sirindhorn of Thailand formally inaugurated the line on March 5, 2009. There is also an under-construction (2017) Keng Tung railway line in east Myanmar that can be extended to Laos in future.

Laos-Vietnam railway: In 2012, an agreement for the construction of 220-kilometre $5 billion line, from Savannakhet in south Laos to Port of Vũng Ang in Vietnam, via Mụ Giạ Pass and Tan Ap (intersects Vietnam railway network), was awarded to a Malaysian company "Giant Consolidated Limited" to complete the construction from 2013 to 2017. By December 2016, installation of corridor posts along the proposed railway right-of-way was completed. In future, Savannakhet is planned to be connected to the existing railway in Thailand at Khon Kaen or Ubon Ratchathani.

India-Myanmar-Thailand-Cambodia railway

Cambodia railway map

India-Myanmar-Thailand-Cambodia railway link is a proposed new railway link, parts of which already exist, by constructing missing links between Aizawl and Imphal to Myanmar railway network, to Thailand, to Combodia to connect the rail network in Cambodia. Cambodia has existing rail link with Thailand at Poipet (Krong Poi Pet), though train services is currently suspended (2017).

India-Myanmar-Thailand-Cambodia-Vietnam railway

India-Myanmar-Thailand-Cambodia-Vietnam railway is a proposed new railway link, parts of which already exist, by constructing missing links between Aizawl and Imphal to Myanmar railway network, to Thailand, to Combodia to connect Vietnam Railways. Cambodia has existing rail link with Thailand at Poipet (Krong Poi Pet) though train services is currently suspended (2017) and Phnom Penh-Hoa Lu-Dĩ An connection with Vietnam is under construction (2017), while there is no current or planned rail connection to Laos. Indian Railways uses broad gauge and Myanmar, Thailand, Vietnam and Malaysia use meter gauge.

India-Myanmar-Thailand-Malaysia-Singapore railway

Malaysia railway map

India-Myanmar-Thailand-Malaysia-Singapore railway is a proposed new railway link as part of the Trans-Asian Railway, parts of which already exist, by using existing metre-gauge connections of Thai railway network to railway network in Malaysia (at Palang Besar in north west and Tumpat in north east Malaysia) and Kuala Lumpur–Singapore high-speed rail (being constructed between 2017 and 2026). Two rail crossings along the Malaysian-Thai border are:
Padang Besar, Malaysia-Padang Besar, Thailand: Both the Malaysian and Thai towns where the crossing is located are known by the same name. This crossing connects to Malaysia's West Coast trunk line and Thailand's main southern line to Bangkok via Hat Yai. Both Malaysian and Thai customs, immigration and quarantine formalities are conducted at Malaysia's Padang Besar railway station.
Rantau Panjang-Sungai Kolok: On the Malaysian side, this bridge crossing is on a branch line which is connected to Malaysia's East Coast line. In Thailand, the crossing is connected to the Su-ngai Kolok branch line which links up with the main southern line at Hat Yai. The crossing is currently not in use (January 2018).

India-Bangladesh Sabroom-Cox Bazar railway

This will extend the existing Sabroom in south Tripura on the border of Bangladesh to Khagrachari-Rangamati-Bandarban district headquarters in the tribal areas of Chittagong Hill Tracts, joining the existing Chittagong-Satkania track at Satkania and proceeding further on the new track to the Cox's Bazar which is one of the official port for transit to India.

India-Bangladesh Baraiya-Zokhawtar railway
This will extend the existing Sabroom in south Tripura on the border of Bangladesh to Baraiya (southwest Tripura)-Chaggalnaiya (Bangladesh)-Manu Bazar (South Tripura)-Sabroom-Khargachari-Magrum-Nunsri
Lunglei-Aizawl-Zokhawtar-Kalemo.

India-Bangladesh Bandarban-Tuiping railway
Route for this will be Bandarban (Bangladesh)-Tuiping (Mizoram)-Niawhtlang (Mizoram-Burma border)-Gangaw (Myanmar).

India-Bangladesh Shillong-Sylhet railway
Route for this will be Shillong and Dawki in India to Sylhet in Bangladesh.

India-Bangladesh Dhubri-Jaria railway
Route for this will be Dhubri, Tura, Barengapara and Durgapur in India to Jaria in Bangladesh.

References

External links
 Ministry of Development of North Eastern Region, Official website
 NEC Final Plan 2017

North East
Northeast India
Government agencies established in 2001
2001 establishments in India
Indigenous affairs ministries